Lars Martinsen (26 November 1908 – 29 December 1956) was a Norwegian footballer. He played in five matches for the Norway national football team from 1938 to 1939.

References

External links
 

1908 births
1956 deaths
Norwegian footballers
Norway international footballers
Place of birth missing
Association footballers not categorized by position